D100 is an Internet radio station established by Albert Cheng.  The radio station was established due to the closure of Digital Broadcasting Corporation.

History
Albert Cheng was prompted to establish D100 due to a management dispute at the Digital Broadcasting Corporation (DBC).  The other shareholders refused to invest in the station as originally planned, and leaked recordings suggested this was due to interference by the Hong Kong Liaison Office over Cheng's decision to hire a pro-democracy radio host.  Cheng thus left the station to found D100.

Telephone broadcasting

References

External links
 
 
 

Internet radio stations